is a railway station on the Nagaragawa Railway Etsumi-Nan Line in the city of Gujō, Gifu Prefecture, Japan, operated by the third-sector railway operator Nagaragawa Railway.

Lines

Station layout
Ōnaka Station has a one ground-level side platform serving a single bi-directional track. The station is unattended.

Adjacent stations

History
Ōnaka Station was opened on 5 July 1933 on the Etsumi-Nan Line operated by Japanese National Railways (JNR). On 28 August 1986, operations of the Etsumi-Nan Line were transferred from JNR to the third-sector operating company Nagaragawa Railway.

Passenger statistics
In fiscal 2002, the station was used by an average of 26 passengers daily.

Surrounding area

 Nagara River

See also
 List of railway stations in Japan

References

External links

 

Railway stations in Japan opened in 1933
Railway stations in Gifu Prefecture
Stations of Nagaragawa Railway
Gujō, Gifu